General transcription factor IIH subunit 5 is a protein that in humans is encoded by the GTF2H5 gene.

Function

The GTF2H5(TTDA) gene encodes a small (71 amino acid) protein that stabilizes the multi-subunit transcription repair factor IIH(TFIIH).  TFIIH plays a key role in a major DNA repair process, nucleotide excision repair (NER), by opening the DNA double helix after the initial recognition of damage in one strand.  This step is followed by excision of the damaged region to generate a single-strand gap, and then repair synthesis, using the undamaged strand as template, to accurately fill in the gap.  Disruption of the GTF2H5(TTDA) gene in a knockout mouse-model completely inactivates NER.  In humans, mutation in any one of four genes can give rise to the trichothiodystrophy phenotype.  These genes are TTDN1, XPB, XPD and GTF2H5(TTDA).

Interactions 

GTF2H5 has been shown to interact with GTF2H2 and XPB.

References

Further reading